Element 14 may refer to:

Silicon, the 14th element in the periodic table of elements
Element 14 (company), a former developer of DSL equipment created from the restructuring of Acorn Computers
Farnell element14, a brand and subsidiary of electronic parts distributor Premier Farnell
Newark element14,  a high-service distributor of technology products